Raymond–Céstan syndrome is caused by blockage of the long circumferential branches of the basilar artery. It was described by Fulgence Raymond and Étienne Jacques Marie Raymond Céstan. Along with other related syndromes such as Millard–Gubler syndrome, Foville's syndrome, and Weber's syndrome, the description was instrumental in establishing important principles in brain-stem localization.

Presentation
 Ipsilateral ataxia and coarse intention tremor (damage to superior and middle cerebellar peduncle)
 Ipsilateral paralysis of muscles of mastication and sensory loss in face (damage to sensory and motor nuclei and tracts of CN V)
 Contralateral loss of sensory modalities in the body (damage to spinothalamic tract and medial lemniscus)
 Contralateral hemiparesis of face and body (damage to corticospinal tract) may occur with ventral extension of lesion
 Horizontal gaze palsy may occur (as in lower dorsal pontine syndrome)

Diagnosis

Treatment

References

Further reading
 
 

Stroke
Syndromes
Neurological disorders
Central nervous system disorders